The Tajikistan men's national basketball team represents Tajikistan in international basketball and is controlled by the Tajikistan Basketball Federation, the governing body of basketball in Tajikistan.

History
Back in the Soviet era, Pamir Dushanbe participated in Soviet Basketball League Competitions, Tajik SSR national team participated in Spartakiads, Boris Sokolovsky had played for both of these teams. Tajik SSR-born Dmitri Sukharev was a member of Unified Team national basketball team at the 1992 Summer Olympic Games.

Despite its active Soviet past, Tajikistan national team currently remains inactive and the only international tournament that the team participated was 2005 Islamic Solidarity Games.

Competitions

FIBA Asia Cup

Notable players
Umed Aknazarov
Shukur Mansurov
Villa Ochildiev

References

External links
Fact Sheet at FIBA website

Men's national basketball teams
Basketball
Basketball in Tajikistan
1994 establishments in Tajikistan